"Wockesha" is a song by American rapper Moneybagg Yo. It was sent to rhythmic contemporary radio on August 10, 2021, as the third single from his fourth studio album, A Gangsta's Pain. He wrote the song alongside Mark and Bunny DeBarge, and producers Real Red, YC, and Javar Rockamore. An official remix of the song, featuring Lil Wayne and Ashanti, was released on September 22, 2021.

Background and composition
The track samples the 1983 song "Stay with Me" by DeBarge, as well as Lil Wayne's 2009 interview with Tim Westwood. The song is an ode to lean; Moneybagg Yo describes his addiction to it ("One minute I'm done with you, the next one I be runnin' back / Go your way, I go my way but somehow we be still attached").

Music video 
The official music video for the track premiered on June 30, 2021. It features a cameo from Lil Wayne, who appears in the beginning of the video, mixing a cup of lean while voicing his sampled speech. In the visual, Moneybagg Yo has a relationship with a styrofoam cup that periodically transforms into a woman.

Critical reception 
Josh Svetz of HipHopDX called the track "somber" and "heart-wrenching".

Charts

Weekly charts

Year-end charts

Certifications

Release history

References 

2021 singles
2021 songs
Interscope Records singles
Moneybagg Yo songs
Roc Nation singles
Songs about drugs